St. Joseph was founded in 1592 by Antonio de Berrio and is the oldest town in Trinidad and Tobago. Originally named San José de Oruña, it served as the capital of Spanish Trinidad between 1592 and 1783. In 1595 the place was attacked and held by Sir Walter Raleigh and was used as a base for his exploration of the Orinoco river in search of the fabled city of El Dorado. Soon after his return the place was burnt and sacked.

St. Joseph is not an incorporated municipality. It falls within the boundaries of the Tunapuna–Piarco region.

Today it is the home of several different schools, including St. Joseph's Convent, St. Joseph, St. Joseph Boys Roman Catholic School, St. Joseph Girls Roman Catholic School, St. Joseph Government School, St. Joseph College, T.M.L Primary School, St Joseph and St. Xavier's Preparatory School.

Tourist attractions
 Jinnah Memorial Mosque

Populated places in Trinidad and Tobago
Populated places established in 1592
16th-century establishments in South America